Kiltiernan Tomb, also called Kiltiernan Portal Tomb or Kiltiernan Dolmen, is a dolmen located in County Dublin, Ireland. It is a National Monument.

Location
Kiltiernan Tomb is located about 1.6 km (1 mile) south-southeast of Stepaside.

The dolmen  
The dolmen is sited on a small ledge, close to one of the head waters of the Loughlinstown River on a gentle west-facing slope. The capstone measures  in length,  in width 
Between the portal stones is a small door stone, blocking entrance to the chamber.

References

Religion in County Dublin
Archaeological sites in County Dublin
National Monuments in County Dublin
Dolmens in Ireland
Tombs in the Republic of Ireland